Mostek is a municipality and village in Ústí nad Orlicí District in the Pardubice Region of the Czech Republic. It has about 300 inhabitants.

Administrative parts
The village of Sudličkova Lhota is an administrative part of Mostek.

References

Villages in Ústí nad Orlicí District